Taypaliito is a genus of spiders in the family Thomisidae. It was first described in 1995 by Barrion & Litsinger. , it contains only one species, Taypaliito iorebotco, found in the Philippines.

References

Thomisidae
Monotypic Araneomorphae genera
Spiders of Asia